The Edward Everett Hale House (New Sybaris; The Red House) is a historic house at 2625A Commodore Oliver Hazard Perry Highway in South Kingstown, Rhode Island. It was commissioned in 1873 by businessman and historian William B. Weeden and designed by architects C. Maxson & Company of Westerly. Edward Everett Hale used the house as a summer home for himself and his family for several decades from the 1870s to the 1910s. The house and added to the National Register of Historic Places in 2007.

See also
National Register of Historic Places listings in Washington County, Rhode Island

References

External links
Hale House

Houses in South Kingstown, Rhode Island
Houses completed in 1873
Houses on the National Register of Historic Places in Rhode Island
National Register of Historic Places in Washington County, Rhode Island
Italianate architecture in Rhode Island
Second Empire architecture in Rhode Island
Victorian architecture in Rhode Island